Nicholas Kipkorir Kimeli (born 29 September 1998) is a Kenyan long-distance runner.

In Hengelo, on 9 June 2019, he ran a 5000 metres personal best in under 13 minutes. At the 2019 London Grand Prix, at the same distance, he finished in third place. He qualified for the final at the 2019 World Athletics Championships in Doha, after being third at the Kenyan Trials.

Kimeli qualified to represent Kenya at the 2020 Summer Olympics, where he finished in fourth place.

During the 2022 Brașov Running Festival, Kimeli won the 10K race with a time of 26:51, breaking the Romanian 10K all-comers record by nearly two minutes, and establishing himself as the fifth-fastest 10K runner ever.

References

External links
 
Diamond League, London

Kenyan male long-distance runners
Living people
1998 births
People from Uasin Gishu County
World Athletics Championships athletes for Kenya
Athletes (track and field) at the 2018 Commonwealth Games
Commonwealth Games competitors for Kenya
Athletes (track and field) at the 2020 Summer Olympics
Olympic athletes of Kenya
20th-century Kenyan people
21st-century Kenyan people
Commonwealth Games silver medallists for Kenya
Commonwealth Games medallists in athletics
Athletes (track and field) at the 2022 Commonwealth Games
Medallists at the 2022 Commonwealth Games